The State University of Leuven was a university founded in 1817 in Leuven in Belgium, then part of the United Kingdom of the Netherlands. It was distinct from the Old University of Leuven (1425-1797) and from the Catholic University of Leuven, which moved from Mechlin to Leuven after the State University had been closed in 1835.

History
The State University of Leuven was founded by King William I of the United Kingdom of the Netherlands in 1817 in Leuven. This continued the history of having a major university in Leuven, with the Old University of Leuven having been active from 1425 to 1797, and the State University used the same campus and facilities and a dozen of professors of the Old University taught there and have resumed the courses they had given in the venerable medieval Alma Mater, as :

 Xavier Jacquelart, who was also a professor in the former University of Leuven
 Jean Philippe Debruyn, of Louvain, licensed in both rights, born December 12, 1766, professor in the old University of Louvain since the year 1794
 Guillaume Joseph van Gobbelschroy, of Louvain, born August 28, 1767, medical graduate, already before, since the year 1783, professor in the old university of Louvain
 Joseph Josse Vandertaelen, extraordinary professor, born April 5, 1766, Tirlemont, medical graduate of the former University of Louvain where he was also a professor
 Ferdinand Sentelet, of Overwinde-Landen, born on July 17, 1754, and died in Louvain on November 26, 1829, graduated in theology, former professor of philosophy at the Pédagogie du Lys and president of the college of Craenendonck, at the former University of Louvain
 Jean-Baptiste Liebaert, from Messines, doctor at the Faculty of Arts of the former University of Louvain, born February 4, 1757
 Étienne Heuschling, of Luxembourg, born in 1760, who had been professor of Hebrew in the old University of Louvain.

Belgium's independence from the Netherlands in 1830/31, plunged the universities into disorder. Attempting to prevent university education from being fragmented, the new government closed Leuven's faculties of law and natural science but backed down due to protests. A proposal to concentrate university education at Leuven was rejected by parliament on 4 August 1835. On 27 September 1835, the state university was officially closed, with most professors moving to the state universities of Ghent and Liège.

Meanwhile, the bishops of Belgium had founded a new Catholic University at Mechelen. This provoked serious riots in the cities of Ghent, Leuven and Liège by liberals, who feared the Church encroaching on state education. After the State University had been closed, the Catholic University moved its headquarters to Leuven on 1 December 1835 and then took the name of Catholic University of Leuven, again leading to protests by liberals, particularly due to its efforts to usurp the heritage and identity of the historical Old University of Leuven.

Buildings
The university was housed in former colleges of the former University: St Donatian's, the Premonstratensian College, the Veterans' College and King's College.

Faculties
The State University of Leuven counted upon the creation the Faculties of Law, Medicine, Science and Mathematics and of the Natural Philosophy and Letters.

Rectors
Harbaur Francis Joseph, (1776–1824) (or Franz Joseph Harbauer), an Alsatian, Court physician, a former pupil of the philosopher Fichte at the University of Jena, had been in Paris, Fulda, St. Petersburg finally arrive in the Netherlands. Unusual character, he spent lavishly to boost the university.
Jacmart Charles (1773–1849), Rector in 1822–1823, 1830–1831 and 1831–1832.
Dumbeck Francis Joseph, 1825–1826.
Jean-François-Michel Birnbaum, rector until October 1827.

Secretaries (Graphiarii)

Gerard Jean Meyer, 1825–1826.

Members of the Academic Senate
Frederick Reiffenberg (1795–1850), historian and philosopher, secretary of the Academic Senate.

Librarian
 Karl Bernhardi
 P. Namur

Notable alumni of the State university of Leuven

 Alexandre Gendebien (1789–1869), liberal politician .
 Andre Dieudonne Trumper (1794–1874), doctor in medicine and Venerable Master of the respectable lodge of the "True Friends of the Union and Progress" at the Orient of Brussels.
 Ferdinand de Meeûs (1798–1861), banker.
 Jules Guerin (1801–1886), physician.
 Sylvain van de Weyer (1802–1874), liberal politician.
 Augustus Van Dievoet (1803-1865), jurist and historian of the law.
 Bernard du Bus de Gisignies (1808–1874), law, politician, ornithologist and paleontologist.
 Hippoliet Van Peene (1811–1864), physician and playwright, wrote the lyrics of the Flemish anthem "De Vlaamse Leeuw"

Bibliography concerning the State University of Leuven

 1817-1826: Annales Academiae Lovaniensis, 1821-1827 (1817–1826).
 1821: Annales Academiae Lovaniensis, 1821: "Discours prononcé le 6 octobre 1817 à l'occasion de l'installation de l'Université par M. le docteur François-Joseph Harbaur, professeur en médecine, nommé recteur magnifique de la même université".
 1835: J. J. Dodt, Repertorium dissertationum belgicarum, Utrecht, 1835.
 1837: A. Ferrier, Description historique et topographique de Louvain, Brussels, Haumann, Cattoir and Cie, 1837.
 1838: Journal historique et littéraire, 1838, p. 88.
 1842: Joseph-Marie Quérard, La littérature française contemporaine, 1842. Biographical notice of the professor Birnbaum, p. 539.
 1848: P. Namur, "notes concernant le Repertorium dissertationum belgicarum", in Le bibliophile belge, n° 5, 1848, pp. 115–118.
 1854: Pierre François Xavier De Ram, Analectes pour servir à l'histoire de l'Université de Louvain, Louvain, 1854, p. 155 (Biography of Xavier Jacquelart).
 1860: E. Van Even, Louvain monumental..., Louvain, C.-J. Fonteyn, 1860.
 1884: Léon Vanderkindere, L'université de Bruxelles. Notice historique, Brussels, 1884 (Concerning the State University of Louvain see: p. 9 et 10).
 1906: Victor Brants, La faculté de droit de l'Université de Louvain à travers cinq siècles (1426-1906) esquisse historique, Louvain, 1906.
 1917: Hubert Nélis, Inventaire des archives de l'Université de l'État à Louvain, Brussels, Hayez, 1917.
 1925: Dr. G. Bourgeois, "Un Fumacien oublié: Charles Jacmart, Recteur Magnifique de l'Université de Louvain", in, Nouvelle Revue de Champagne et de Brie, Largentière (Ardèche), 3rd year, 1925, pp. 9 and seq. .
 1948: Carlo Bronne, L'amalgame ou la Belgique de 1814 à 1830, Brussels, ed. Paul Legrain, s. d.(Concerning the State University of Louvain, see: pp. 269–270).
 1952: Carlo Bronne, La tapisserie royale, Brussels-Paris, 1952, p. 92.
 1955: Albert Bruylants, "Les chimistes louvanistes et leur temps", II, "L'École Centrale de la Dyle (1795-1814) et l'Université d'État (1816-1835)", in, Bulletin trimestriel de l'Association des Amis de l'Université de Louvain, n°3, 1955.
 1964: Jean Jacmart, "Généalogie de la famille Jacmart", in, Recueil de l'Office Généalogique et Héraldique de Belgique, tome XII, Brussels, 1963, p. 114.
 1967: Florilège des sciences en Belgique, Brussels, Royal Academy of Belgium, 1967, p. 118.
 1973: B. Borghgraef van der Schueren, De Universiteiten in de Zuidelijke Provincies onder Willem I, Brussels, 1973.
 1975: "La faculté de droit de l'Université d'État de Louvain", in Jura Falconis, XI, 1975 (3).
 1986: Mia De Neef, De Faculteit Wijsbegeerte en Letteren van de Rijksuniversiteit te Leuven (1817-1835), non edited thesis, Leuven, KUL, 1986.
 1986: G. Vanpaemel, "J. B. Van Mons (1765-1842) en het scheikundige-onderwijs aan de Rijksuniversiteit Leuven", in Communications de l'Académie Royale, Classe des Sciences, 48, 1986, n° 4, pp. 87–100.
 1987: Geertrui Couderé, "De studenten aan de Rijksuniversiteit Leuven (1817-1835)", in Liber amicorum Dr. J. Scheerder, Louvain, 1987, p. 241 à 261.
 1987: Arlette Graffart, "La matricule de l'Université de Louvain (1817-1835)", in Album Carlos Wyffels, Brussels, 1987, pp. 177–178.
 1990: Emiel Lamberts and Jan Roegiers, Leuven University, 1425-1985, Louvain, University Press, 1990.
 1999: Christian Laporte, L'affaire de Louvain: 1960-1968, 1999, p. 26.
 2008: Philippe et Nadine Quinet-De Saeger, André Dieudonné Trumper, médecin à Bruxelles au XIXe siècle, Brussels, Studia Bruxellae, 2008, p. 47.

See also
Academic libraries in Leuven
Collegium Trilingue
Katholieke Universiteit Leuven
Louvain-la-Neuve
Old University of Leuven
Université catholique de Louvain
Universities in Leuven

Notes

External links

Universities in Belgium
Educational institutions established in 1817
1817 establishments in the Netherlands
1835 disestablishments
Education in Leuven
History of Leuven
William I of the Netherlands